Lai Châu is a city in the Northwest region of Vietnam. It is the capital city of Lai Châu Province. The city borders Phong Thổ District, Sìn Hồ District và Tam Đường District.

History

Lai Châu, or Muang Lay (Vietnamese: Mường Lay) was the seat of lords of the White Tai who were dominant over other Thai peoples of the area, though there was rivalry between the White Tai rulers of Muang Lay and Muang So. During the 1870s Muang Lay was the base of lord Đèo Văn Trị of the White Tai who sought to unite and become chief of the 12 mường (Sino-Vietnamese:  / ) making up the Sip Song Chau Tai. This he partially achieved, with the help first of the Chinese Black Flags, then later the French. His authority, and the autonomy of the area, was recognised by the French in 1890.

Demographics
As of 2020 the city had a population of 42,973, covering an area of 92.37 km².

Administrative divisions
Lai Châu City is officially divided into 7 commune-level sub-divisions, including 5 wards (Đoàn Kết, Đông Phong, Quyết Thắng, Quyết Tiến, Tân Phong) and 2 rural communes (San Thàng, Sùng Phài).

Climate
Lai Châu has a humid subtropical climate (Köppen Cwa), typical for northwestern Vietnam, with hot, oppressively humid, and wet summers and warm to very warm, dry winters.

References

Provincial capitals in Vietnam
Districts of Lai Châu province
Populated places in Lai Châu province
Cities in Vietnam